Zagreb City Museum or Museum of the City of Zagreb located in 20 Opatička Street, was established in 1907 by the Association of the Brethren of the Croatian Dragon. 

It is located in a restored monumental complex (12th-century Popov toranj, the Observatory, 17th-century Zakmardi Granary) of the former Convent of the Poor Clares, of 1650. 

The Museum deals with topics from the cultural, artistic, economic and political history of the city spanning from the prehistory, Roman finds to the modern period. The holdings comprise 75,000 items arranged systematically in a combined chronological and thematic approach into collections of artistic and mundane objects characteristic of the city and its history. It consists of a number paintings, maps, city views, furniture, flags, military uniforms and coats of arms.

Notes

External links

 

Museums established in 1907
Museums in Zagreb
City museums
History of Zagreb
Gornji Grad–Medveščak
1907 establishments in Croatia